Superbad is the soundtrack to the 2007 film of the same name. It was released on August 7, 2007, on Lakeshore Records. The album features original music by Lyle Workman and Bootsy Collins, performed by a reunion of the original JBs rhythm section with Bootsy and Phelps Collins, Clyde Stubblefield, and Jabo Starks, and supplemented by Bernie Worrell.  Also featured are songs by artists such as Curtis Mayfield and Rick James.

Track listing

Tracks that appeared in the movie but not on the soundtrack album 
 "Journey to the Center of the Mind" by The Amboy Dukes
 "Ace of Spades" by Motörhead
 "I'm Your Boogie Man" by KC and the Sunshine Band
 "Panama" by Van Halen
 "Are You Man Enough" by The Four Tops
 "Big Poppa" by The Notorious B.I.G.
 "Echoes" by The Rapture
 "My Favorite Mutiny"  by The Coup
 "Chop Chop You're Dead" by Cities In Dust
 "These Eyes" by The Guess Who (Performed by Michael Cera, and briefly heard when cops drive by)
 "This Is Yr Captain" by C'Mon

Notes

Funk soundtracks
2007 soundtrack albums
Comedy film soundtracks